Lucia Oskerova (born December 3, 1990) is a Slovak-Canadian actress and former model.

Personal life 
Lucia Oskerova was born on December 3, 1990, in Bratislava, Slovakia, which was then a part of Czechoslovakia. She graduated with a degree in Design & Architecture from the British Columbia Institute of Technology. 

She has been in a relationship with actor Anthony Michael Hall since the summer of 2016. They became engaged on September 7, 2019, and married in 2020.

Oskerova speaks four languages and enjoys traveling.

Career 
Oskerova, who began her career at the age of fifteen, became a Fashion Week star, walking for Dolce & Gabbana, Prada, Dior, Chanel, Fashion Rocks, Leone, Bob oli and Vetrina. Oskerova is best known for playing in movies and series like Smallville (2005), Spider-Man: Far From Home (2019) and Once Upon a Time in Hollywood (2019).

Filmography

Film

Television

References 

1990 births
21st-century Canadian actresses
Canadian people of Slovak descent
Living people
People from Bratislava